The Mississauga Halton LHIN is a Local Health Integration Network (LHIN) in the Canadian province of Ontario. It is a community-based, non-profit organization funded by the Government of Ontario through the Ministry of Health and Long-Term Care.

Services
Mississauga Halton LHIN plans, funds and coordinates the following operational public health care services to a population of approximately 1.2 million people:

 Hospitals
 Credit Valley Hospital (Mississauga, ON)
 Mississauga Hospital (Mississauga, ON)
 Queensway Health Centre (Etobicoke, ON)
 Milton District Hospital (Milton, ON)
 Oakville-Trafalgar Memorial Hospital (Oakville, ON)
 Georgetown and District Memorial Hospital (Georgetown, ON)
 Long-Term Care Homes
 Community Care Access Centre (CCAC)
 Community Support Service Agencies
 Mental Health and Addiction Agencies
 Community Health Centres (CHCs)

Geographic area
Mississauga Halton LHIN services a region that includes a south-west portion of the City of Toronto, the south part of the Regional Municipality of Peel, and the Regional Municipality of Halton except for the City of Burlington, which is part of the Hamilton Niagara Haldimand Brant LHIN.  The LHIN includes the municipalities of South Etobicoke, ON, Mississauga, ON, Halton Hills, ON, Oakville, ON, and Milton, ON.

Budget
The Mississauga Halton LHIN has an annual budget of approximately $1.1 billion.

References

External links
 Mississauga Halton LHIN - official web site

Health regions of Ontario